Elections to Worcestershire County Council took place on 6 May 2021 as part of the 2021 United Kingdom local elections.

Summary

Election result

|-

Results by division

Bromsgrove

Malvern Hills

Redditch

Worcester

Wychavon

Wyre Forest

References 

2021 English local elections